Gambling in India varies by state; states in India are entitled to formulate their own laws for gambling activities. Some states like Goa have legalised casinos. Common gambling activities like organized betting are restricted except for selective categories including lottery and horse racing.

In the 21st century, more people have started making cash bets upon prohibited betting and gambling activities in India. Critics of gambling claim that it leads to crime, corruption, and money laundering. However, proponents of regulated gambling argue that it can be a huge source of revenue for the state. Casinos in Goa contributed ₹135 crores to the state revenue in 2013.
Recently published research revealed that Maharashtra state supplies the most online casino players in the country.13

Casinos now operate in Goa, Daman, and Sikkim.

Legality
Gambling is a state subject, and only states in India are entitled to formulate laws for gambling activities within their respective states. The Public Gambling Act of 1867 is a central law that prohibits running or being in charge of a public gambling house. The penalty for breaking this law is a fine of 200 or imprisonment of up to 3 months. The Act also prohibits visiting gambling houses. A fine of 100 or imprisonment of up to one month is the penalty.

Indian law classifies games into two broad categories viz. game of skill and game of chance. The Supreme Court of India has held The game of Rummy is not a game entirely of chance like the ‘three-card’ game mentioned in the Madras case to which we were referred. The ‘three cards’ game which goes under different names such as ‘flush’, ‘brag’ etc. is a game of pure chance. Rummy, on the other hand, requires a certain amount of skill because the fall of the cards has to be memorised and the building up of Rummy requires considerable skill in holding and discarding cards. We cannot, therefore, say that the game of Rummy is a game of entire chance. It is mainly and preponderantly a game of skill.The Information Technology Act 2000 regulates cyber activities in India does not mention the word Gambling or Betting thereby the act was left for interpretation by the Courts which have refused to examine the matter.  Further, online gambling is a banned offence in the state of Maharashtra under the "Bombay Wager Act".

Only three states, Goa, Daman and Sikkim, allow casinos. There are two casinos in Sikkim called Casino Sikkim and Casino Mahjong and ten in Goa, of which six are land-based and four are floating casinos that operate on the Mandovi River. The floating casinos in Goa are Casino Deltin Royale, Casino Deltin JAQK, Casino Pride, and Casino Pride 2. While the first two are controlled by the Deltin Group, the latter two are managed by the Pride Group. According to the Goa, Daman and Diu Public Gambling Act, 1976 casinos can be set up only at five-star hotels or offshore vessels with the prior permission of the government. This has led the Deltin Group to open the first land-based Casino in Daman which is open now. News reports also suggest that Visakhapatnam is also being looked on as the next casino destination.

Online
Online gambling is in its infancy in India:

 There are no federal laws that prohibits online betting in India
 A few states have made recently explicit laws against online betting
 Ancient regulations like the Public Gambling Act of 1867 are still in place. however there are not any cases on record of Indian players being prosecuted for online betting.

In 2010, Sikkim planned to offer three online gambling licences. By 2022 online gambling is only officially legal in the states of Goa, Daman and Sikkim. Sikkim also permits an online lottery, which takes bets from players throughout India. It was expected that other states would follow Sikkim, thereby opening up a major online gambling market, aka matka gambling, throughout India.

Even though Indian casinos cannot promote or have sites that promote online gambling games such as casinos, sports betting, and bingo, it is not illegal for non-Indian casino companies (so-called offshore companies) to have sites that focus on Indian players. The only legal requirement is that the offshore casinos have to offer Indian Rupees as a payment method for Indian players. Although this is not accurate anymore since January 2020 as the states Telangana and Andhra Pradesh banned all online gambling for Indians. Anyone breaking this new law will receive up to one year in prison or a fine.

Legalisation
Despite the existing prohibitive legislations, there is extensive illegal gambling throughout the country. The Indian gambling market is estimated to be worth US$60 billion per year, of which about half is illegally bet. According to the Indian National Newspaper, the chief executive officer for the International Cricket Council (ICC) said he was in favour of legalising betting in sports. He believes the illegal funds profited are through underground bookies that used the money to fund terrorism and drugs. Several Indian institutions have suggested that betting should be regulated and taxed. These include the Committee on Reforms in Cricket in 2015, the Law Commission of India in 2018 and court judgements from the Supreme Court. Many Indian professionals, as well as online forums, have urged the government to introduce legal but regulated gambling in India to bring the gambling economy out of the grip of mafia and underground dons.

The Public Gambling Act of 1867 - An Act to provide for the punishment of public gambling and the keeping of common gaming houses in India.

The Prize Competition Act of 1955 - The Prize Competition Act was passed by Parliament in 1955 to restrict gambling activities that awarded prizes as winnings. According to the Prize Competition Act, any prize competition where a prize is offered on solving a puzzle,  number, alphabet, crossword, missing word, or picture prize competitions, where the winnings more than ₹1,000 shall be banned.

The Information Technology Act of 2000 - This law regulates cyber activities in India and does not include any information about gambling or betting”. Thus, this document was left for interpretation by the Courts, but they have refused to consider the matter.

In 2022, the Indian government announced its plan on creating a new gaming bill to replace the Public Gambling Act of 1867.

Payment gateways
One of the biggest obstacles faced by sports bettors in India is the fact that depositing foreign bookies is extremely difficult. Typically, the majority of users deposit to online bookies using Moneybookers or Neteller.  Some attempts to deposit using a Visa or MasterCard may fail. The same is true of online bank transfers. In order to circumvent these blocks, savvy internet users have started to use e-wallet services for depositing. These services, enable users to fund an online betting account in Rupees. This is important because it avoids legal issues that may have arisen out of F.E.M.A Foreign Exchange law.

See also
 Matka gambling

References

 
Social issues in India